Bannatyne's (full name Bannatyne Fitness Ltd) is a United Kingdom-based chain of health clubs founded by Scottish businessman Duncan Bannatyne.

History
The Bannatyne Health Clubs chain began in 1997 with the first club built in Ingleby Barwick, North Yorkshire.

It was reported in March 2016 that the company was planning a £300m float, listing on AIM.  However, this proposed float was pulled in May 2016 due to unspecified "regulatory scrutiny" of the move.

Personnel
In 2016, Justin Musgrove, formerly the Managing Director, took on the role of Chief Executive Officer, Ken Campling was appointed as Chief Financial Officer and Board Director and Anthony Elliott as Director of Operations.

Portfolio
As of May 2016, Bannatyne's has 66 gyms, 37 spas and five hotels across the UK and plans to add a further 16 spas to existing health clubs this year. Bannatyne's spent £7.5m last year revamping 29 of its health clubs and the remaining 37 gyms will be refitted this year after sales grew by 7% at the refurbished clubs. The company also bought Clarice House and Xpect Leisure last year, growing its membership by 14% over the year to 186,456.

On 9 August 2006, Bannatyne Fitness Ltd acquired the LivingWell Premier Health club chain from the Hilton Hotel UK Group, taking the Bannatynes Health club chain to 62 locations. At the end of 2015/beginning of 2016, The Bannatyne Group acquired 4 more health clubs taking its total to 66 across the UK, boasting 195,000 current members.

Fraud
In November 2015, former finance director Christopher Watson was jailed after pleading guilty to defrauding the Bannatyne Group of nearly £8 million.

References

External links
 

Health clubs in the United Kingdom
Companies based in County Durham
1997 establishments in England